Bounds Green is a residential suburb just north of Wood Green, in the London Borough of Haringey in north London. Parts of it are also known as New Southgate, but most of New Southgate lies in the London Borough of Enfield to the north-west.

Bounds Green was originally formed as a popular overnight stop-over for travellers, located on the then outskirts of London, just short of the tollgate at Turnpike Lane. Bounds Green Underground station on the Piccadilly line, opened in 1932, is in the area previously known as Bowes Park and which is also served by Bowes Park railway station. The original name of Bounds Green was associated with the former Bounds Green Farm near Cline Road, some 500 metres to the north-west of the Underground station.

The Green is still extant in part and is the common land either side of Bounds Green Road. The common of approximately two acres is bounded by Warwick Road, The Drive, Tewkesbury Terrace and Bounds Green Brook to the north of the A406 North Circular Road. Control of the common land passed to the London Borough of Haringey from the Municipal Borough of Wood Green in 1965. Other green areas of land include the Albert Road Recreation Ground and Golf Course Allotments.

Education

Demography 
Bounds Green's overall population spread mirrors that seen in Haringey more widely, with just under half of residents aged 20–44 (44.3%), and a small proportion aged 65+ (9.5%). There is no major variation in age group composition across the ward.'

Bounds Green has a larger proportion of residents whose ethnicity is White Other (30.5%), compared to the wider Haringey population (25.9%). While the proportion of White British residents in Bounds Green is similar to the proportion of residents of White Other ethnicity, this group is slightly under-represented in the ward (29.7% compared to 34.7% in Haringey).'

Religion in Bounds Green mirrors Haringey more widely, with the largest proportion of residents (49%) identifying as Christian. This is a slightly larger proportion compared to Haringey (45%).'

Transport links 
Bounds Green has good transport links, with its own tube station on the Piccadilly line. Bowes Park mainline station, on the line into Kings Cross and Moorgate, is a short distance away. There are also a number of bus services connecting Bounds Green to the surrounding areas. Bounds Green is bordered by the A406 North Circular Road to the north.

Bounds Green Traction Maintenance Depot services trains on the East Coast Main Line, which passes through the area.

In popular culture
Mike Skinner of The Streets mentions Bounds Green in the track "Has It Come To This", from the album Original Pirate Material, in the line "my underground train runs from Mile End to Ealing, from Brixton to Bounds Green".

Cylob has a 2007 album called Bounds Green.

Notable people
Eminent surgeon Henry Cline (1750–1827) bought Bounds Green House in 1808, together with surrounding farmland. The house was located to the south of the present Cline Road. Cline was a surgeon at St Thomas' Hospital and later became President of the Royal College of Surgeons (1823).

Dan Gillespie Sells, lead singer of the Feeling, grew up in Bounds Green and some of the band members still live in the area. The title of the Feeling's first album, Twelve Stops and Home, refers to the journey Gillespie used to make home to Bounds Green from Leicester Square. The title comes from lyrics in the album track "Blue Piccadilly".

The heavy rock group UFO was formed in Bounds Green in 1969.

Nearest places
 Wood Green
 Bowes Park
 Muswell Hill
 Friern Barnet
 New Southgate
 Arnos Grove
 Alexandra Palace

References

External links
Bowes and Bounds Connected: Community website for Bowes Park and Bounds Green 
The History of Bounds Green and Bowes Park, Hornsey Historical Society

 
Districts of the London Borough of Haringey
Areas of London
Places formerly in Middlesex